Brayley may refer to:
 Bertie Brayley (b. 1981), English football player.
 Desmond Brayley, Baron Brayley (1917-1977), British Army officer, businessman and briefly Government minister.
 Edward Wedlake Brayley (1773–1854), English antiquary and topographer
 Edward William Brayley (1801–1870), British geographer, librarian, and science writer; son of Edward Wedlake Brayley.
 John Desmond Brayley (1917–1977), British Army officer, businessman, and government minister.
 Brayley, a lunar crater named after Edward William Brayley.